Dzielawy  is a village in the administrative district of Gmina Polska Cerekiew, within Kędzierzyn-Koźle County, Opole Voivodeship, in south-western Poland.

The village has a population of 171.

References

Dzielawy